Evolve is the 12th studio album by singer-songwriter Ani DiFranco, released in 2003 (see 2003 in music).  The album won DiFranco and Brian Grunert a Grammy Award for Best Recording Package in 2004. This album is more eclectic and stylistically venturous than DiFranco's previous works, experimenting with styles such as jazz and funk.

Track listing
All songs by Ani DiFranco.

Personnel
Ani DiFranco – guitar, piano, vocals
Ravi Best – trumpet, vocals
Shane Endsley – trumpet
Daren Hahn – percussion, drums
Todd Horton – trumpet, flugelhorn
Jason Mercer – bass
Hans Teuber – clarinet, flute, saxophone, vocals
Julie Wolf – organ, piano, vocals, clavinet, melodica, Fender Rhodes

Production
record producer – Ani DiFranco
Engineers – Andrew Gilchrist, Mark Hallman, Marty Lester
Mixing – Ani DiFranco
Mastering – Greg Calbi
Design – Ani DiFranco
Photography – Eric Frick
Art direction – Brian Grunert

Charts

References

External links
 

Ani DiFranco albums
2003 albums
Righteous Babe Records albums